Smiljan Pavič (born February 5, 1980 in Slovenj Gradec, SR Slovenia, SFR Yugoslavia) is a Slovenian professional basketball player currently playing for KK Žoltasti Troti in the Slovenian Second League.

External links
 ABA League profile

1980 births
Living people
ABA League players
AEK B.C. players
ASK Riga players
Bandırma B.İ.K. players
Basketball League of Serbia players
Centers (basketball)
KK Krka players
KK Olimpija players
KK Zlatorog Laško players
KK Vojvodina Srbijagas players
Slovenian expatriate basketball people in Serbia
Slovenian men's basketball players
Sportspeople from Slovenj Gradec
Helios Suns players